Chengyang railway station is a railway station in Chengyang District, Qingdao, Shandong, China.

History
The station was built in 1901.

From 16 March 2015, Chengyang railway station has been closed to passengers for refurbishment as part of the construction of the second part of the Qingdao–Rongcheng intercity railway, between Jimo and Qingdao. At the time, this work was expected to take one year. The station buildings were rebuilt, this was completed in 2020. It reopened on 1 July 2022.

References 

Railway stations in Shandong
Railway stations in China opened in 1901